Ernst Herbeck (9 October 1920, Stockerau, Lower Austria – 11 September 1991) was an Austrian poet. In 1940, at the age of 20, Herbeck was committed to the national mental hospital in Lower Austria (Niederösterreich) where he spent almost his entire life, writing thousands of poems, until his death on 11 September 1991.

Life

Herbeck grew up in Stockerau, Lower Austria, where at the age of 20 whilst working as an unskilled worker in a munitions factory, began displaying signs of schizophrenia.
He was first committed in 1940, but at times his condition would improve momentarily. In October 1944 he was even called into military service only to be discharged in March 1945.
A year after the end of the war Herbeck was committed indefinitely.
After fifteen years in an institution Herbeck began writing poetry, often referred to as naive, his poetry is notable for its brevity and peculiar turn of phrase.
The titles of many of his poems are the names of animals that were offered to him by his psychiatrist Leo Navratil as exercises.
Two years before his death Herbeck gave over 1,000 of his handwritten sheets to the Austrian national library as donation.

Legacy

W. G. Sebald wrote an article about Herbeck entitled Das Häschens Kind, der kleine Has: On the poet Ernst Herbeck's totem animal, the hare, collected in the book Campo Santo. Sebald also recounts a visit with an elderly Ernst Herbeck in his novel Vertigo. Herbeck also featured as a character in Philipp Weiss's 2013 play Ein schöner Hase ist meistens der Einzellne.

References

External links
 Twelve Poems by Ernst Herbeck, Translated by Gary Sullivan
 Ernst Herbeck blog with poems in German and in English translation by Gary Sullivan
 Herbecks Versprechen  electronic sound performance by Karlheinz Essl
 Robin Pape, Burkhart Brückner: Biography of Ernst Herbeck in: Biographical Archive of Psychiatry (BIAPSY), 2015.

1920 births
1991 deaths
People from Stockerau
20th-century German poets
German male poets
20th-century German male writers